Susan Matheson is a costume designer who designed costumes for the films The Kingdom, Friday Night Lights, Blue Crush, Crazy/Beautiful, Honey, Panic and Best Laid Plans.  She has designed for three movies starring Will Ferrell - Step Brothers,
 Semi-Pro, and Talladega Nights: The Ballad of Ricky Bobby.  She designed for the film Couples Retreat starring Vince Vaughn and Jon Favreau which premiered in the fall of 2009.

Biography
Susan Matheson grew up in Cape Town, South Africa. Susan received her bachelor's degree from Vassar College and her BFA from Parsons School of Design where she received the "Designer of the year" award as well as design awards from Nike, Inc. and Bob Mackie. Upon graduation, she went to work for Mattel Toys designing for both Barbie and Disney.

Since then she has gone on to design costumes for both film and theater.

Susan has collaborated with performance artists Ron Athey, Juliana Snapper and Nicole Blackman.  She collaborated most recently with Juliana Snapper and composer Andrew Infanti in May 2009 on the world's first underwater opera "You who will emerge from the flood" at the Victoria Baths in Manchester, U.K.

References

External links
 
 Susan in LA Weekly

Costume designers
Jewish fashion designers
Year of birth missing (living people)
Living people
South African fashion designers
South African women fashion designers
South African Jews